David Parker  (born 30 July 1956)  is an English chemist and professor at the University of Durham.

Early life and education
David Parker was born in Leadgate, County Durham, the descendant of musical, mining families and the third child of a bank clerk and primary school teacher. He grew up in Durham, England and was educated at Durham Johnston School and briefly at King Edward VI High School, Stafford. Having gained an Open Exhibition to Christ Church, Oxford, he read Chemistry at the University of Oxford, where he gained a First Class degree in 1978, and a DPhil in 1980, based on mechanistic studies in asymmetric catalysis.

Career and research
In 1980, he was appointed a NATO Fellowship to work with Jean-Marie Lehn (Nobel Prize, 1987), and was appointed to a Lectureship in Chemistry at Durham University, beginning in January 1982.

Parker's research investigates the design and synthesis of functional molecules, materials and conjugates and has straddled the traditional disciplines of Physical, Organic and Inorganic Chemistry.  Often collaborating with European and UK industry, he has worked on diverse collaborative projects leading to the introduction of imaging and therapeutic agents, including the antibody conjugate MyloTargR (Celltech Ltd.).

Awards and honours
Parker gained recognition from the Royal Society of Chemistry, being awarded, among other prizes, the Corday-Morgan Medal (1987), the Hickinbottom Award (1988), an Interdisciplinary Award (RSC, 1996), a Tilden Lectureship (2003) and the Ludwig Mond Prize and Medal (2011). In 2002 he was elected a Fellow of the Royal Society (FRS) and gained the ICI Prize in Organic Chemistry in 1991 and the Lecoq de Boisbaudran prize in rare earth science in 2012. He served as Chairman of the Department of Chemistry at Durham on two occasions before his fiftieth birthday. In 2014, he was made an EPSRC RISE Fellow, recognising inspiration in science and engineering. Over thirty of his former research group members now hold academic positions in leading universities in 15 countries across the world, from Oxford, Dublin and Durham to Sydney, Hong Kong and Johannesburg.

Personal life
During University, Parker played cricket and football. He married [1979], Fiona Mary MacEwan with whom he has two daughters, Eleanor and Julia Rose and a son, Philip. He is a grandfather to three boys: Thomas (2015), Harrison (2017), Alexander (2018) and Rosabelle (2019).

References 

English chemists
1956 births
Living people
Academics of Durham University
Fellows of the Royal Society
Rare earth scientists